Shining Days may refer to:
Shining☆Days (episode), the finale of the My-HiME anime series
Shining☆Days (single) by Minami Kuribayashi
闪亮的日子, a 2009 Chinese TV series starring Bianca Bai
璀璨人生, a 2013 Chinese TV series with 80 episodes, also known as Cui Can Ren Sheng and Brilliant Days.

See also
Our Shining Days, a Chinese film
Shiny Days (disambiguation)